Seven Points is a city in Henderson and Kaufman counties in the U.S. state of Texas. The population was 1,455 at the 2010 census, up from 1,145 at the 2000 census.

The city is named for an intersection where seven roads converge. These are not Old West wagon trails, however; the town did not exist until nearby Cedar Creek Reservoir was built in the 1960s, and was not incorporated until the 1970s. The seven roads consist of two state highways (three directions), a farm-to-market road, and three county roads.

Geography

Seven Points is located in northwestern Henderson County at  (32.333044, –96.212939). A small part of the city extends north along Seven Points Road (Texas State Highway 274) into Kaufman County. Highway 274 leads north  to Kemp and southeast  to Trinidad. Texas State Highway 334 (East Cedar Creek Parkway) leads east from Seven Points across Cedar Creek Reservoir  to Gun Barrel City.

Demographics

As of the 2020 United States census, there were 1,370 people, 532 households, and 384 families residing in the city.

Education
The Kemp Independent School District serves most of Seven Points, although portions of the city lie within the Mabank Independent School District.

Revenue through traffic citations

In the fiscal year September 1, 2010 to August 31, 2011 Seven Points raised $521,995 from traffic citations. Seven Points made 43% more than Gun Barrel City in fines, although Gun Barrel City has 75% more people.

Below is a chart with a four-year history of fines collected by Seven Points and three surrounding cities:

References

External links
 
 Cedar Creek Library
 Seven Points Economic Development Corporation

Cities in Henderson County, Texas
Cities in Kaufman County, Texas
Cities in Texas
Dallas–Fort Worth metroplex